John Charles Rood (born 1968) is an American national security adviser and former government official who served as the Under Secretary of Defense for Policy from January 2018 to February 2020. Before that, he was Senior Vice President of Lockheed Martin where he oversaw international business. He also served as vice president for Domestic Business Development at Lockheed Martin and he was a vice president at the Raytheon Company.

Early life and education 
Rood was born in 1968. He earned a Bachelor of Science degree in economics from Arizona State University.

Career 
Rood also served as Acting Under Secretary of State for Arms Control and International Security from September 2007 to January 2009, and as Assistant Secretary of State for International Security and Nonproliferation from October 2006 to September 2007. He served at the United States National Security Council as special assistant to the president and senior director of Counterproliferation and Director of Proliferation Strategy for Counterproliferation in Homeland Defense. Rood served at the Defense Department as Deputy Assistant Secretary of Defense for Forces Policy, and at the Central Intelligence Agency as an analyst following missile programs in foreign countries. In addition, he served as senior policy advisor to U.S. Senator Jon Kyl of Arizona.

On October 16, 2017, Rood was nominated by President Donald Trump to become the Under Secretary of Defense for Policy. He was confirmed by the United States Senate on January 3, 2018. In January 2018, Secretary James N. Mattis released the National Defense Strategy (NDS) which placed the order of priorities for the Department of Defense as China, Russia, North Korea, Iran and then Countering Terrorism. As the Under Secretary of Defense for Policy, Rood was responsible for the implementation of the NDS worldwide. On February 19, 2020, Rood was asked to leave the administration by President Trump and offered his resignation effective February 28, 2020.

See also
Trump–Ukraine scandal

References 

George H. W. Bush administration personnel
Arizona State University alumni
Living people
1968 births
George W. Bush administration personnel
Arizona Republicans
Employees of the United States Senate
Analysts of the Central Intelligence Agency
United States Under Secretaries of State
United States Under Secretaries of Defense for Policy
Trump administration personnel
Trump–Ukraine scandal